William Patton (August 23, 1798 - September 9, 1879), was a pastor, abolitionist, and the son of Revolutionary War colonel and the first Postmaster of Philadelphia Robert Patton. He was the father of the abolitionist William Weston Patton.

Career 

He graduated at Middlebury College in 1818, and, after studying at Princeton theological seminary, was ordained. During twenty-six years of his life he was pastor of churches in New York city. From 1834-37, he was secretary of the American Education Society. He spent the latter part of his life in New Haven, Connecticut, engaged in literary and ministerial work. He was the first to suggest the idea of the World Evangelical Alliance, which he did in a letter to Rev John Angell James, of England, in 1843. 

He attended the convention in London in August 1846, that organized the alliance. He was a founder of the Union Theological Seminary, and first proposed its establishment. He made fourteen visits to Europe between 1825 and 1879. He was an earnest opponent of slavery, and for forty years a member of the executive committee of the American Home Missionary Society. His views on the subject of temperance were equally radical. 

In the pulpit he was characterized not so much by breadth and accuracy of scholarship, finish of style, or elegance of delivery, as by his strong grasp upon his subject, his simplicity, directness, aptness, and freshness. He received the degree of D. D. from the University of the City of New York.

Publications 
Besides editing President Jonathan Edwards's work on "Revivals" and Charles G. Finney's "Lectures on Revivals" (London, 1839), preparing the American editions of The Cottage Bible, of which over 170,000 copies were sold, and The Village Testament (New York, 1833), and assisting in editing The Christian Psalmist (1836), he published The Laws of Fermentation and the Wines of the Ancients (1871); The Judgment of Jerusalem , Predicted in Scripture, Fulfilled in History (London, 1879); Jesus of Nazareth (1878); and Bible Principles and Bible Characters (Hartford, 1879).

Notes

References

External links
 
 
 

1798 births
1879 deaths
American theologians
Activists from Philadelphia
American abolitionists
American temperance activists
Christian abolitionists
Religious leaders from New Haven, Connecticut
Middlebury College alumni